Veronica Lalande-Lapointe is a Canadian ten-pin bowler. She finished in 21st position of the combined rankings at the 2006 AMF World Cup.

References

Canadian ten-pin bowling players
Canadian sportswomen
Living people
Year of birth missing (living people)
Place of birth missing (living people)
21st-century Canadian women